Don Mueang is a khwaeng (subdistrict) of Don Mueang District, in Bangkok, Thailand. In 2020, it had a total population of 82,077 people.

References

Subdistricts of Bangkok
Don Mueang district